Leon Morris Hendrix (born January 13, 1948) is an American painter, songwriter, and musician who began playing the guitar later in life and has released several albums. He is the brother of American rock guitarist and singer Jimi Hendrix.

He is best known for his original artwork.

Personal life
He is the brother of American rock guitarist and singer Jimi Hendrix. He suffered from drug addiction and he spent time in prison for minor offenses.

He is the father of six and grandfather of four.

Hendrix was employed for many years as an expert draftsman by Boeing. In recent years Hendrix has been attempting to make a living from music and art. The Leon Hendrix Band released two albums, Keeper of the Flame in 2006, as well as the earlier Seattle Rain. In 2012, Hendrix published a biography of his brother titled Jimi Hendrix: A Brother's Story. It was co-written by Adam Mitchell and published by St. Martin's Press.

Estate dispute
When Leon's father, Al, died in 2002, his will left control of the company Experience Hendrix, which controls the rights to Jimi Hendrix's estate, to Al's adopted daughter, Janie Hendrix, and his nephew, Robert Hendrix. Leon sued to have his father's will overturned but in 2004 the court ruled that Leon "was not entitled to anything from his father's will, other than a single gold record left to him when his father died in 2002."

Documentary 

Leon appeared in the 2004 documentary about his brother, Jimi Hendrix: By Those Who Knew Him Best, that also featured musician Sammy Drain and Octavia inventor Roger Mayer.

Later years

In 2021, Hendrix released his album If You Need a Friend. The title song was co-written by Brin Addison. The album is a mixture of genres from psychedelic rock to funk and blues. Seattle artist Annie O’Neill also sings on the album. It also features the song, "Crying from them Blues.

Discography

"Under the Sky of Another Dream" (2014); guitar player for the music single made by Veronica Vitale

References

External links
 Leon Hendrix Band Myspace
  CC Carole interviews Leon Hendrix

1948 births
African-American guitarists
African-American rock musicians
African-American male singer-songwriters
American people who self-identify as being of Native American descent
Jimi Hendrix
Lead guitarists
Living people
Musicians from Seattle
Guitarists from Washington (state)
20th-century American guitarists
21st-century American guitarists
Singer-songwriters from Washington (state)